Johannes Vilmann (also Johannes or Juhan Villman; 10 March 1875 Taebla Parish, Lääne County – ?) was an Estonian politician. He was a member of I Riigikogu. He was a member of the Riigikogu since 25 September 1922. He replaced Jüri Uluots.

References

1875 births
Members of the Riigikogu, 1920–1923
People from Lääne County
Year of death missing